The trembita (from the old Germanic trumba, "to trumpet") is an alpine horn made of wood. It is common among Ukrainian highlanders Hutsuls who  live in western Ukraine, eastern Poland, Slovakia, and northern Romania. In Poland it is known as a trombita (in the south), a bazuna (in the north), or a ligawka (in central Poland).

Description 

A trembita was used primarily by mountain dwellers known as Hutsuls and Gorals in the Carpathians, it was used as a signaling device to announce deaths, funerals, weddings.

The tube is made from a long straight piece of pine or spruce (preferably one that has been struck by lightning) which is split in two in order to carve out the core. The halves are once again joined together and then wrapped in birch bark or osier rings. It is also used by shepherds for signaling and communication in the forested mountains and for guiding sheep and dogs. The trembita has a timbre that is much brighter than that of the alpenhorn due to its narrow bore and very minor flare.

The trembita has no lateral openings and therefore gives the pure natural harmonic series of the open pipe. The upper harmonics are the more readily obtained by reason of the small diameter of the bore in relation to the length.

The notes of the natural harmonic series overlap, but do not exactly correspond, to notes found in the familiar chromatic scale in standard Western equal temperament. Most prominently within the trembita's range, the 7th and 11th harmonics are particularly noticeable because they fall between adjacent notes in the chromatic scale.

In the hands of a skilled composer or arranger, the natural harmonics can be used to haunting melancholy effect or, by contrast, to create a charming pastoral flavor.

Modern use 
Today trembita is often used in Ukrainian ethnographic ensembles and as an episodic instrument in the Ukrainian folk instrument orchestra.

Trembita was shown on 2004 Eurovision Song Contest by the Ukrainian winner of the contest Ruslana during her performance of the song "Wild Dances".

Trembita is also used by Ukrainian band ONUKA.

The longest trombita (8,35 m) was made by Polish folk musician Józef Chmiel, located in the Czech Republic.

Similar instruments
 Alphorn, used by mountain dwellers in Switzerland and elsewhere
 Erke, a similar instrument of the Argentine Northwest
 Birch trumpet, a similar instrument used in Norway, Sweden and the Baltic region
 Lur, native Scandinavian term for Birch trumpet
 Trâmbiță or Bucium, a type of alphorn used by mountain dwellers and by shepherds in Romania and Moldova

See also
 Ukrainian folk music
 Polish folk music
 Romanian folk music
 Slovak folk music

References

Sources
 
 
 
 Demonstration of trembita performance
 Mr Plyushko explains about trembita to students 
 Christmas call by trembitas

External links

 Samples and Pictures of Ukrainian Instruments
 Trembita's Natural Scale and Genesis of Folk Tunes
Trembita's scale as the origination of chordal triads and heroic fanfares in the diatonic scale

Natural horns and trumpets
Ukrainian musical instruments